The XVI Racquetball European Championships were held in Bad Tölz, near Munich, (Germany) from August 1 to 7 2011, with five countries represented. The venue was the Racquetball Club Bad Tölz e.V., with 3 regulation racquetball courts. 50 players competed in the singles, doubles, junior and senior competitions. The opening ceremony was on August 1 with the vice president of the European Racquetball Federation, Mike Mesecke, and the president of the German Racquetball Federation, Jörg Ludwig.

The 2011 European Racquetball Championships were the third European Championships that were held in Bad Tölz after 1995 and 1999.

Men's national teams competition

August 1/2, 2011

Men's teams final standings

Women's national teams competition

Women's teams final standings

Men's Single competition

Women's Single competition

Men's Doubles competition

Ladies Doubles competition

See also
European Racquetball Championships

External links
[Results for the teams competition] ERF website
Men's singles results
Women's singles results
Men's doubkes results
Women's doubles results

European Racquetball Championships
Racquetball
2011 in German sport
Racquetball in Germany
International sports competitions hosted by Germany